Dera Ghazi Khan railway station is located at Dera Ghazi Khan, Pakistan.

History
It was built in 1969.

Trains
 Chiltan Express

See also
 List of railway stations in Pakistan
 Pakistan Railways

References

1969 establishments in Pakistan
Railway stations in Dera Ghazi Khan District
Railway stations on Kotri–Attock Railway Line (ML 2)